The 2022 Presbyterian Blue Hose football team represented Presbyterian College as a member of the Pioneer Football League (PFL) during the 2022 NCAA Division I FCS football season. Led by first-year head coach Steve Englehart, the Blue Hose played home games at Bailey Memorial Stadium in Clinton, South Carolina.

Previous season

The Blue Hose finished the 2021 season 2–9, 0–8 in PFL play to finish in last place. On December 4, 2021, after one year, head coach Kevin Kelley resigned. Former Florida Tech head coach Steve Englehart was named the next head coach for Presbyterian.

Schedule

Game summaries

at Austin Peay

Virginia University of Lynchburg

at Western Carolina

Davidson

at Morehead State

According to ESPN+ commentary, the deciding factor in the game was "the touchdown that wasn't called" for Presbyterian. A completed pass into the end zone was not awarded as a touchdown by the official, probably because he mistook the goal-line of the soccer pitch as the back of the end zone.

Valparaiso

at San Diego

St. Thomas (MN)

at Marist

Dayton

Blue Hose freshman Dominic Kibby caught 7 passes for 212 yards, including 3 touchdowns. This places him third for single-game receiving yards (second for games against D1 opposition) and ties him at second for most touchdown receptions in a single game for Presbyterian College, or outright second in games against D1 opponents.

at Stetson

References

Presbyterian
Presbyterian Blue Hose football seasons
Presbyterian Blue Hose football